Monster File Number One is a 1981 role-playing game supplement published by The Dragon Tree.

Contents
Monster File Number One is a set of 48 5 1/2" x 3 1/2" cards with fantasy monster specifications printed on one side and a monster drawing on the other.

Reception
Lewis Pulsipher reviewed Monster File One in The Space Gamer No. 42. Pulsipher commented that "By 1974 standards this is a decent set - better than All the World's Monsters I, for example - but by 1981 standards the monsters do not show well. If the format appeals to you you might want to try this set or the planned Monster File Two. Otherwise, you'll have to decide if a few usable monsters are worth [the price]. I don't think so."

References

Fantasy role-playing game supplements
Role-playing game supplements introduced in 1981